Consortium Linking Universities of Science and Technology for Education and Research (CLUSTER) is a collection of twelve European universities which focus on science and engineering. There are joint programs and student exchanges held between the universities. The focus of the network is courses and study programmes, the goal being to offer students attractive exchanges between the best institutes of technology in Europe, along with dual degree partnerships at second- and third-cycle level, joint funding applications for courses and study programmes, exchanges for benchmarking purposes and approaches to policy issues at EU level.

President of CLUSTER is Tanja Brühl, the president of the Technische Universität Darmstadt.

Members

Active members 
The participating universities are:

Associate members 
Although the number of Cluster members has remained stable over the years, the network is creating new connections with leading universities outside Europe. These associated members are:

References

External links
CLUSTER

College and university associations and consortia in Europe
Engineering education
International organizations based in Europe
Science and technology in Europe
Technology consortia